The 1968 NC State Wolfpack football team represented North Carolina State University during the 1968 NCAA University Division football season. The Wolfpack were led by 15th-year head coach Earle Edwards and played their home games at Carter Stadium in Raleigh, North Carolina. They competed as members of the Atlantic Coast Conference, winning the conference with a record of 6–1. The Wolfpack had an overall record of 6–4 and were not invited to a bowl game.

Schedule

References

NC State
NC State Wolfpack football seasons
Atlantic Coast Conference football champion seasons
NC State Wolfpack football